David Adger,  (born 23 September 1967) is a Professor of Linguistics at Queen Mary University of London. Adger is interested in the human capacity for syntax. Adger served as president of the Linguistics Association of Great Britain from 2015 to 2020.

Early life and education 
Adger was born on 23 September 1967 in Kirkcaldy, Fife, Scotland. At the age of eleven Adger became fascinated by language, reading Ursula K. Le Guin's A Wizard of Earthsea. At the age of sixteen, Adger won a school competition coordinated by the University of St Andrews and spent the money on copies of Noam Chomsky's Aspects of the Theory of Syntax. He studied linguistics and artificial intelligence at the University of Edinburgh. Adger has described his undergraduate teaching as one of the "exhilarating experiences of my life". He remained in Edinburgh for his graduate studies, working toward a master's in cognitive science. He completed a doctorate under the supervision of Elisabet Engdahl in 1994. During his doctorate he worked at the University of Massachusetts Amherst. His doctoral research considered Agr nodes.

Research and career 
Adger became a lecturer at the University of York in 1993. In 2002 Adger moved to the Queen Mary University of London, where he had been appointed Reader in Linguistics. He was appointed Professor of Linguistics in 2006.

His research considers the science of language, and whether human brains create language because of our ability to recognise patterns or because of an innate ability to communicate via language. He has investigated the nature of grammatical structure and the relationship between sociolinguistic theories and syntactic structure.

In 2015, Adger was elected president of the Linguistics Association of Great Britain. He visited the University of Maryland, College Park in 2016, where he delivered a series of lectures discussing minimalist syntax, semantics and merge.

In July 2020, Adger was a notable signee on a petition for the removal of Steven Pinker from the Linguistic Society of America’s honorary status as Fellow of the society.

Selected publications

Papers

Books 
 
 
 

From 2007 to 2013 Adger served as editor of Syntax.

Personal life 
Adger is married to Anson W. Mackay, a geographer at University College London. He is a member of 500 Queer Scientists, an organisation that champions LGBT scientists and engineers. Adger was listed as one Queen Mary University of London role models in 2018.

References 

1967 births
Living people
Scottish linguists
Scottish LGBT scientists
Alumni of the University of Edinburgh
Academics of the University of York
Academics of Queen Mary University of London
LGBT academics
21st-century Scottish LGBT people